Bo Joseph Bichette (born March 5, 1998) is an American professional baseball shortstop for the Toronto Blue Jays of Major League Baseball (MLB).

High school
Bichette was home schooled, but competed in baseball for Lakewood High School in St. Petersburg, Florida. As a senior, he batted .569 with 13 home runs, and was named the Gatorade/USA Today Florida Player of the Year and Florida's Mr. Baseball. Bichette committed to attend Arizona State University to play college baseball for the Arizona State Sun Devils.

Professional career

Minor leagues

The Toronto Blue Jays selected Bichette in the second round, with the 66th overall selection, of the 2016 Major League Baseball draft. He stated afterward that he turned down four offers during the draft in order to go to Toronto, and signed for a $1.1 million bonus on June 17. After opening the season with a .431 batting average through 18 games with the Gulf Coast League Blue Jays, Bichette was placed on the 7-day injured list after experiencing an injury to his midsection, which was later determined to be a ruptured appendix. He returned to the lineup shortly before the end of the season, and finished the year with a .427 batting average, four home runs, and 36 runs batted in (RBI) in 22 games. Despite missing more than half of the season with injury, Bichette was named the Gulf Coast League's end-of-season All-Star at shortstop on September 13. During the offseason, he represented Brazil at the 2017 World Baseball Classic – Qualifier 4.

Bichette was assigned to the Class-A Lansing Lugnuts to begin the 2017 season. On June 7, he was named a Midwest League All-Star. To that point in the season, Bichette led the league in batting average, hits, runs scored, slugging percentage, and on-base plus slugging percentage (OPS). Bichette raised his batting average to an even .400 after a 7-for-8 performance in a doubleheader against the South Bend Cubs on June 15. On June 29, he was named to the U.S. roster for the 2017 All-Star Futures Game. On July 6, Bichette was named the Midwest League Player of the Month for June. Later that day, the Blue Jays announced he would be promoted to the Advanced-A Dunedin Blue Jays after the All-Star Futures Game. Bichette was named the Midwest League's Most Valuable Player (MVP), Prospect of the Year, and a Postseason All-Star on August 18 after hitting .384/.448/.623 with 32 doubles (2nd in the Midwest League), 10 home runs, and 51 RBIs in 70 games for Lansing. For Dunedin, Bichette appeared in 40 games and hit .323 with four home runs, 23 RBI, and 10 stolen bases. His combined .362 batting average led all of Minor League Baseball, and made him the first teenager to lead the minors in hitting since Gil Torres did so in 1963. On October 5, 2017, MLB named Bichette Toronto's Minor League Hitter of the Year.

In 2018, he played for the Double-A New Hampshire Fisher Cats. He appeared in 131 games and batted .286 with 95 runs (leading the Eastern League), 43 doubles (leading the league), 7 triples (tied for the league lead), 11 home runs, 74 RBIs (tied for 3rd), 48 walks (9th), and 32 stolen bases (2nd). Bichette began the 2019 season with the Triple-A Buffalo Bisons. On April 22, he was hit on the left hand by a pitch and later diagnosed with a broken hand.

Toronto Blue Jays
On July 29, 2019, the Blue Jays selected Bichette's contract and promoted him to the major leagues. On that day, he recorded his first major league hit, a single against Brad Keller of the Kansas City Royals, on just the second major league pitch he saw. On July 31, Bichette recorded three hits against the Royals, the second of which was his first MLB home run. On August 6, Bichette became the first ever MLB player to hit 10 extra base hits in his first nine major league games with a double against the Tampa Bay Rays. After hitting another double on August 7, Bichette joined Yadier Molina and Derrek Lee as the only players in the live-ball era to record a double in eight-straight games, and broke the Blue Jays franchise record set by Carlos Delgado in 2000. Playing in Toronto for the first time the following day, Bichette extended his doubles streak to nine games, setting a new MLB record. He also set a new MLB record in extra base hits in the first 11 games of his career with 13. He is the first rookie with 9 straight games with extra base hits since Ted Williams in 1939. Bichette set franchise records with 20 hits and an 11-game hit streak with 1.316 OPS during the 11-game span. He finished the season hitting .311 with 11 home runs in 46 games.

Overall with the 2020 Blue Jays, Bichette batted .301 with five home runs and 23 RBIs in 29 games.

On July 4, 2021, Bichette was named an All-Star for the first time in his career. At the time of his nomination, Bichette had a slash line of .290/.340/.529 and had 15 home runs and 54 RBI. Bichette finished the 2021 season batting .298/.343/.484 with 29 home runs, 102 RBIs and 25 stolen bases. He led the American League with 191 hits, while defensively he led the league with 24 errors.

On September 5, 2022, Bichette had a 3-home run game in a game against the Baltimore Orioles. In doing so, he also made history with teammate Vladimir Guerrero Jr., in which they were the first pair of teammates to have a 3-home run game in the same season, and both have fathers play in the MLB.

In 2022 he batted .290/.333/.469, and led the majors in foul balls hit, with 587.

Batting style
Bichette is a power hitter, and can generate great bat speed and power. According to Joe Siddall: "He does it by separating and delaying torso rotation after the foot hits the floor after leg kick, exposing his back plate surname and number, before uncoiling, with the bat at the same angle as his shoulders. When facing a strikeout or pay-off pitch (X-2 or 3-2), he replaces the leg kick with the left knee bowing inwards."

Personal life
Bichette is the son of four-time MLB All-Star outfielder Dante Bichette, and the younger brother of Dante Bichette Jr. He is named after Bo Jackson. He is a Christian. Both Bo and his brother Dante Jr. have played for Brazil in the WBC due to their mother Mariana being a native of Porto Alegre, Brazil. Their maternal grandfather is of Chinese descent.

See also

 List of people from Orlando, Florida
 List of second-generation Major League Baseball players

References

External links

1998 births
Living people
American League All-Stars
American expatriate baseball players in Canada
American sportspeople of Brazilian descent
American sportspeople of Chinese descent
Baseball players from Orlando, Florida
Buffalo Bisons (minor league) players
Dunedin Blue Jays players
Gulf Coast Blue Jays players
Lansing Lugnuts players
Major League Baseball shortstops
New Hampshire Fisher Cats players
Toronto Blue Jays players